WKQZ (93.3 FM The Rock Station, Z93) is an active rock radio station serving east-central Michigan, owned by Cumulus Media.  The station is licensed to Midland, Michigan, although its studios are in Saginaw. WKQZ is the Tri-Cities affiliate for the Detroit Lions.

Programming
Z93 plays mostly active rock tracks, but also frequents in some classic rock.

Since November 2016, Z93 mornings have been known as "The Morning After with Matt and Adam", hosted by longtime morning show host Adam Shilling and program director Matt Bingham, who returned to the station after he was downsized in 2011. The show replaced "Joe and the Poorboy" as long time morning show mainstay Joe Volk was terminated in August 2016 after being with the station for over 30 years. Middays [10am - 3pm) are hosted by Breck and afternoons (3pm - 7pm) are voice tracked by 97.9X Wilkes Barre, PA program director Mike “Duffy”.

History
What is now Z93 was originally WRCI "Easy 93.5", an adult contemporary music station at 93.5 FM in Midland. WRCI was locally programmed at first, but in 1982, affiliated with the "Star Station" adult contemporary format delivered via satellite by Satellite Music Network. The station then tried a country format, known as "Kickin' Country 93.5 WRCI", for a very short period of time. After going off the air briefly, the station changed its calls to WKQZ, and in February 1986, returned to the air as "Z93-5 The Rock Station."  Brian Maloney was the Program Director who launched the station and held morning drive.  Detroit radio consultant Paul Christy was influential in starting the station.  Under its new rock format, "Z93-5" got off to a fast start and was well received by rock radio listeners in the Tri-Cities.  The station became presenting sponsor for many shows at the Saginaw Civic Center including Alice Cooper with Slaughter, Triumph, Ted Nugent and more. The station soon afterward shifted from 93.5 to 93.3, enabling a boost in power from 3,000 to 39,000 watts.

References

Michiguide.com - WKQZ History

External links

KQZ
Active rock radio stations in the United States
Midland, Michigan
Cumulus Media radio stations
Radio stations established in 1986
1986 establishments in Michigan